The Kharampur gas field is a natural gas field located in the Yamalo-Nenets Autonomous Okrug. It was discovered in 1966 and developed by and Gazprom. It began production in 1972 and produces natural gas and condensates. The total proven reserves of the Kharampur gas field are around 18.4 trillion cubic feet (526 km³), and production is slated to be around 250 million cubic feet/day (7.1×105m³) in 2013.

References

Natural gas fields in Russia
Natural gas fields in the Soviet Union